Group A of the 1986 FIFA World Cup was one of six groups of national teams competing at the 1986 FIFA World Cup. The group's first round of matches began on 31 May and its last matches were played on 10 June. Most matches were played at the Estadio Olímpico Universitario in Mexico City or at the Estadio Cuauhtémoc in Puebla. Eventual champions Argentina topped the group, joined in the second round by 1982 champions Italy as well as Bulgaria. South Korea were making their first appearance in the tournament since 1954.

Standings

Matches

Bulgaria vs Italy

Argentina vs South Korea

Italy vs Argentina

South Korea vs Bulgaria

South Korea vs Italy

Argentina vs Bulgaria

Group A
A
Bulgaria at the 1986 FIFA World Cup
Group
South Korea at the 1986 FIFA World Cup